The Chasuarii were an ancient Germanic tribe known from the reports of authors writing in the time of the Roman Empire. They lived somewhere to the east and north of the Rhine, near the modern river Hase, which feeds into the Ems. This means they lived near modern Osnabrück.

Tacitus in his Germania (Chapter 34) says they are between Ems and Weser, to the north of the Angrivarii and Chamavi (who had also expanded into the area once belonging to the Bructeri, between Ems, Weser and Lippe). In this same area as the Chasuarii were the Dulgubnii (but then probably nearer the Weser).

To their north, on the coast of the North Sea, were the Chauci. By the account of Tacitus, the Chauci in his time had not only the coast in this region, but would have also stretched down to the lands of the Cherusci (north of the Harz mountains) and Chatti (in modern Hessen).

Claudius Ptolemy in his Geography places Chasuarii (Κασουάροι), east of the Tencteri and Abnoba mountains which run north-south and parallel with the Rhine, and west of the Harz mountains where he places some Chamavi (Camavi) between the Cherusci and the Chatti. Interpretation of this passage in Ptolemy is difficult, and it may contain systematic errors. The position for the Chasuarii and Chamavi and many other tribes does not correspond to other sources, and for example in the case of the Chamavi and Tubantes, this includes post Roman records.

Although the theory is not widely supported, the Chasuarii are sometimes thought to be equivalent to, or related to, the Chattuari, and maybe even the Chatti, based on similarity of names.

References

See also
List of ancient Germanic peoples

Early Germanic peoples
Osnabrück